The New Brunswick Junior Hockey League (NBJHL) was a Canadian Junior ice hockey league in the province of New Brunswick.  The NBJHL was in competition for the Callaghan Cup and Centennial Cup as a Junior A league.

History
Possibly founded in 1969, the NBJHL was the premier Jr. A league of the province of New Brunswick.  In 1970, the league was relegated to Tier II Junior A and competition for the Centennial Cup.  In 1982–83, the league was in direct competition for fans with the American Hockey League, who put two of their Semi-Professional teams in the NBJHL's Jr. A markets.  In 1983, the Fredericton Red Wings folded, leaving the Moncton Hawks as the only strong team in the league.  Instead of continuing on in the depleted NBJHL, the Hawks elected to move to Nova Scotia's Jr. A league, the Metro Valley Junior Hockey League, leaving the NBJHL to fold.

The core of the league through its entirety seems to have been the Moncton Beavers and teams from Fredericton, like the Fredericton Chevies, Fredericton High School, and Fredericton Red Wings.

Teams
Blacks Harbour Silverkings
Cap-Pele Fishermen
Edmundston Eskimos
Fredericton Chevies
Fredericton High School Black Kats
Fredericton Jr. North Stars
Fredericton Red Wings
Moncton Beavers
Port City Mariners
Riverview Blues
Riverview Reds
Saint John 77's
Saint John Stingers
Sussex Royals
University de Moncton Blue Eagles

Champions
1970 Fredericton Chevies
1971 Moncton Beavers
1972 Moncton Beavers
1973 Moncton Beavers
1974 Moncton Beavers
1975 Cap-Pele Fishermen
1976 Saint John 77's
1977 Fredericton Red Wings
1978 Fredericton Red Wings
1979 Fredericton Red Wings
1980 Moncton Beavers
1981 Moncton Beavers
1982 Moncton Hawks
1983 Moncton Hawks

External links
Hockey New Brunswick

Defunct ice hockey leagues in New Brunswick